This is a list of neighborhoods in Memphis.

Downtown
Central Business District
Edge District
Harbor Town
 Linden
Medical District
Pinch District
South Forum
South Main Arts District                    
Speedway Terrace
Uptown/Greenlaw
Victorian Village
Warehouse District
Winchester Park

Midtown
Annesdale
Belleair
Central Gardens
Chickasaw Gardens
Cooper-Young
Crosstown
Evergreen
Hein Park
Idlewild
Lea's Woods
Lenox
Rozelle
Tucker-Jefferson
Vollintine-Evergreen, including Vollintine Hills

University District
 East Buntyn
 Normal Station
 Joffre
 Messick-Buntyn
 Red Acres

East Memphis
Balmoral/Quince
Belle Meade
Berryhill
Cherry/Willow
Colonial Acres
Fisherville
Galloway Gardens/Walnut Grove
Hedgemoor
Hickory Hill
High Point Terrace
Pidgeon Estates
River Oaks
Sea Isle Park
Sherwood Forest
White Station

North Memphis
Douglass
Frayser
Hollywood
Hyde Park
Klondike 
New Chicago
Scutterfeld
Smokey City
University Street Neighborhood

Northeast
Bartlett
Berclair-Jackson
Binghampton
Nutbush
Raleigh
Sycamore View
Highland Heights
Mitchell Heights

South Memphis
Alcy-Ball
Barton Heights
Boxtown
Bunker Hill
Coro Lake
Diamond Estates
Dixie Heights
Dukestown
Elliston Heights
Emerald Estates
French Fort
Gaslight Square
Handy Holiday
Indian Hills
Lakeview Gardens
Lauderdale Sub
Longview
Mallory Heights
Nehemiah
Pine Hill
Prospect Park
Riverside
Ruby Estates
Southern Heights
Soulsville
Walker Homes
West Junction
Westhaven
Westwood
Whitehaven
Wilbert Heights

Southeast
Bethel Grove
Capleville
Castalia
Cherokee
Easthaven
Fairlawn
Fox Meadows
Hickory Hill
Magnolia
Oakhaven
Orange Mound
Parkway Village
Riverdale
Southwind

East Parkway District
Fairgrounds
Glenview
Lamar Avenue (Highway 78)
Poplar Avenue
Union Extended

See also
 
 Memphis metropolitan area

 01
Geography of Memphis, Tennessee
Memphis, Tennessee
Neighborhoods, Memphis
Memphis Neighborhoods